Konjac (or konjak) is a common name of the East and Southeast Asian plant Amorphophallus konjac (syn. A. rivieri), which has an edible corm (bulbo-tuber). It is also known as konjaku, konnyaku potato, devil's tongue, voodoo lily, snake palm, or elephant yam (though this name is also used for A. paeoniifolius).

It is native to Yunnan in China and cultivated in warm subtropical to tropical East and Southeast Asia, from China and Japan south to Indonesia and Vietnam (USDA hardiness zone 6–11). It is a perennial plant, growing from a large corm up to 25 cm (10 in) in diameter. The single leaf is up to 1.3 m (4 ft) across, bipinnate, and divided into numerous leaflets. The flowers are produced on a spathe enclosed by a dark purple spadix up to 55 cm (22 in) long.

The food made from the corm of this plant is widely known in English by its Japanese name, konnyaku (yam cake), being cooked and consumed primarily in China, Japan and Korea. The two basic types of cake are white and black. Noodles made from konnyaku are called shirataki. The corm of the konjac is often colloquially referred to as a yam, though it is not related to tubers of the family Dioscoreaceae.

History
Wild forms grow naturally in China and Southeast Asia. Konjac has been used in Japan since the 6th century, supposedly as a medicinal food.

Cultivation and use

Konjac is grown in East and Southeast Asia and it is prized for its large starchy corms, used to create a flour and jelly of the same name. It is also used as a vegan substitute for gelatin.

In Japan, over 90% of all domestically produced konjac is made in Gunma Prefecture.

East Asia
In Japanese cuisine, konjac (konnyaku) appears in dishes such as oden. It is typically mottled grey and firmer in consistency than most gelatins. It has very little flavor; the common variety tastes vaguely like salt, usually with a slightly oceanic taste and smell (from the seaweed powder added to it, though some forms omit the seaweed).  

In Japan, it is valued more for its texture than flavor. 
 is a Japanese food consisting of konjac cut into noodle-like strips. It is usually sold in plastic bags with accompanying water, which is drained before cooking. It is often used in sukiyaki and oden. The name literally means 'thread-konjac'.

Japanese konnyaku is made by mixing konjac flour with water and limewater. Hijiki is often added for the characteristic dark color and flavor. Without additives for color, konjac is white. It is then boiled and cooled to solidify. Konjac made in noodle form is called shirataki and used in foods such as sukiyaki and gyūdon.

Konjac is consumed in parts of China's Sichuan province; the corm is called moyu, and the jelly is called "konjac tofu" ( móyù dòufu) or "snow konjac" ( xuě móyù).

In Vietnam, konjac is mainly grown in An Giang province. The corms are collected and processed into flour. The flour is used to make drinks, cakes, and noodles.

Traditional medicine
The dried corm of the konjac plant contains around 40% glucomannan gum. This polysaccharide makes konjac jelly a viscous substance that may be used in traditional Chinese medicine.

Fruit jelly
Konjac can also be made into a popular East Asian fruit jelly snack, known variously in the United States as lychee cups (after a typical flavor) or konjac candy, usually served in bite-sized plastic cups.

Choking risk
Perhaps because of several highly publicized deaths and near-deaths in the San Francisco Bay Area among children and elderly people caused by suffocation while eating konjac candy, the U.S. Food and Drug Administration (FDA) issued product warnings in 2001, and there were subsequent recalls in the United States and Canada. Choking and intestinal blockage risk warnings have been published at more recent websites.

Unlike gelatine and some other commonly used gelling agents, konjac fruit jelly does not melt readily in the mouth. Some products form a gel strong enough to require chewing to disintegrate the gel. Though the product is intended to be eaten by gently squeezing the container, a consumer can suck the product out with enough force to unintentionally lodge it in the trachea. Because of this hazard, the European Union and Australia banned konjac fruit jelly.

Some konjac jelly snacks are not of a size and consistency that pose a choking risk, but are nonetheless affected by the government bans. Some products that remain in East Asian markets have an increased size, unusual shape, and more delicate consistency than the round, plug-like gels that were associated with the choking incidents. The snacks usually have warning labels advising parents to make sure their children chew the jelly thoroughly before swallowing.

Japan's largest manufacturer of konjac snacks, MannanLife, temporarily stopped producing the jellies after a 21-month-old Japanese boy choked to death on a frozen MannanLife konjac jelly. 17 people died from choking on konjac between 1995 and 2008. MannanLife konjac jelly's packaging bag now shows a note to consumers, advising them to cut the product into smaller pieces before serving it to small children.

In 1999, Michelle Enrile, 12, from San Jose, CA, choked on a piece of konjac gel candy.  She lapsed into a coma and died two years later.  The Enriles won a $16.7 million judgment against the Taiwanese manufacturer of the candy.

Vegan seafood alternative

Konjac corm powder has a noticeably fishy smell and is used as an ingredient in vegan alternative seafood products. It can be incorporated into plant-based versions of seafood. For Chinese cooking, thin strands of konjac gel can be used as substitute for shark fins when preparing a plant-based version of shark fin soup.

Other uses
Konjac can also be used for facial massage accessories, which are currently popular in Korea and gaining popularity in the West. Most commonly this is through the use of a konjac sponge, which is unique in that it can be used on sensitive skin that may become easily irritated with more common exfoliating tools (such as loofahs or washcloths).

It can be used in the formulation of drugs and devices such as oral colon-targeting drug delivery systems (OCDDS), which enable drugs to be delivered directly to the colon.

In traditional hand papermaking in Japan, konnyaku imparts strength to paper for dyeing, rubbing, folding—and other manipulations, such as momigami.

Shirataki noodles have gained popularity in the United States for their low carbohydrate content.

See also

Muk
Shirataki noodles

References

External links 

konjac
Chinese condiments
Edible thickening agents
E-number additives
Jams and jellies
Japanese condiments
Medicinal plants
Natural gums
Papermaking
Plants described in 1858
Root vegetables
Sichuan cuisine